Namakkal division is a revenue division in the Namakkal district of Tamil Nadu, India.

References 
 

Namakkal district